Samuel Buček (born 19 December 1998) is a Slovak professional ice hockey forward who is currently playing for HC Oceláři Třinec of the Czech Extraliga (ELH).

Playing career
Undrafted, Buček made his professional debut playing in the Tipsport liga (Slovak) with HK Nitra during the 2015–16 season.

Buček made 5 appearances in the Finnish Liiga, with KooKoo before returning to Nitra during the 2019–20 season. He moved to fellow Slovakian club, HC Slovan Bratislava during the following 2020–21 season, collecting 11 points through just 14 games.

Having returned to his original club, HK Nitra, for the 2021–22 season, Buček led the team and league in scoring posting 41 goals and 64 points in just 50 games. He was named the playoffs MVP for a second time in his career, after leading all scorers with 13 goals and 24 points in a finals defeat to former club, Slovan Bratislava.

As a free agent, Buček opted to pursue a career in North America. On 11 July 2022, he became the first player in franchise history to be signed by the Coachella Valley Firebirds of the American Hockey League (AHL). He was signed to a one-year contract for the Firebirds inaugural season in 2022–23, serving as the primary affiliate to the Seattle Kraken of the National Hockey League (NHL). Before joining the Firebirds, on 8 August 2022, Buček signed a one-year contract with Neftekhimik Nizhnekamsk of the KHL, opting to pursue a career in Russia instead.

International play
Buček represented Slovakia in the IIHF World U20 Championship where they get Eliminated in Quarter-finals and get 8th place, Buček scoring the 3 goals and 4 assist in the tournament.

Career statistics

Regular season and playoffs
Bold indicates led league

International

Awards and honours

References

External links

 

1998 births
Living people
Sportspeople from Nitra
Slovak ice hockey right wingers
HK Nitra players
Chicago Steel players
Shawinigan Cataractes players
KooKoo players
HC Slovan Bratislava players
HC Neftekhimik Nizhnekamsk players
HC Oceláři Třinec players
Slovak expatriate ice hockey players in Canada
Slovak expatriate ice hockey players in the United States
Slovak expatriate ice hockey players in Finland
Slovak expatriate ice hockey players in the Czech Republic
Slovak expatriate ice hockey players in Russia